This is a list of international presidential trips made by Dilma Rousseff, the 36th President of Brazil. During her presidency, which began with her inauguration on 1 January 2011 and ended with her impeachment on 31 August 2016, Rousseff visited 24 countries as of July 2012.

Summary of international trips

2011
The following international trips were made by President Dilma Rousseff in 2011:

2012
The following international trips have been made by President Dilma Rousseff during her second year in office as of December 2012:

2013
On 17 September 2013, President Rousseff cancelled her state visit to Washington, D.C. on 3 October 2013, because of alleged spying by the United States that targeted Brazil.

2015
The following international trips were made by President Dilma Rousseff in 2015:

References

External links
Presidência da República Official list of presidential trips made by the President of Brazil in 2011. 

Dilma Rousseff
Lists of 21st-century trips
Rousseff, Dilma
Rousseff, Dilma
Rousseff
Rousseff, Dilma